The UK Singles Chart is one of many music charts compiled by the Official Charts Company that calculates the best-selling singles of the week in the United Kingdom. Since 2004 the chart has been based on the sales of both physical singles and digital downloads, with airplay figures excluded from the official chart. This list shows singles that peaked in the Top 10 of the UK Singles Chart during 2004, as well as singles which peaked in 2003 but were in the top 10 in 2004. The entry date is when the song appeared in the top 10 for the first time (week ending, as published by the Official Charts Company, which is six days after the chart is announced).

Two hundred and ten singles were in the top ten in 2004. Ten singles from 2003 remained in the top 10 for several weeks at the beginning of the year. Hey Ya! by Outkast was the only single from 2003 to reach its peak in 2004. Sixty-five artists scored multiple entries in the top 10 in 2004.  Dizzee Rascal, Kanye West, Kasabian, Maroon 5 and Snow Patrol were among the many artists who achieved their first UK charting top 10 single in 2004.

The 2003 Christmas number-one, "Mad World" by Michael Andrews featuring Gary Jules (which was recorded for the 2001 film Donnie Darko), remained at number-one for the first week of 2004. The first new number-one single of the year was "All This Time" by 2003 Pop Idol winner Michelle McManus. The release sent McManus into the Guinness Book of Records as the first Scottish female to reach the top of the charts with their debut single. Overall, thirty different singles peaked at number-one in 2004, with Busted (3) having the most singles (including their appearance on Band Aid 20's "Do They Know It's Christmas?") hit that position.

Background

Multiple entries
Two hundred and ten singles charted in the top 10 in 2004, with 200 singles reaching their peak this year (including the re-entry "Mysterious Girl" which charted in previous years but reached a peak on its latest chart run).

Sixty-six artists scored multiple entries in the top 10 in 2004. Pete Doherty had the most top 10 entries in 2004 with five. This included one solo hit ("For Lovers), one entry with Babyshambles ("Killamangiro"), and three entries with The Libertines ("Can't Stand Me Now, "What Became of the Likely Lads" and "Born in England" as part of Twisted X, supporting England ahead of UEFA Euro 2004).

Thirteen artists recorded four or more top 10 singles across the course of 2004. Of these, seven artists totals included an appearance on the Band Aid 20 charity single, which reached number-one. Two of Busted's other three singles in 2004 also peaked at the top spot, with "Who's David" and ""Thunderbirds"/"3AM"" both landing the coveted position. "Air Hostess" just missed out, reaching number-two in May. Jamelia's biggest solo hit of the year was "Thank You" which lost out on number-one to Peter Andre's "Mysterious Girl" in March. She scored two further top tens with "See It In A Boy's Eyes" (5) in July and double-A side "DJ"/"Stop" (9) in November.

Natasha Bedingfield began to catch up with her brother Daniel's chart success with three top ten entries on top of the Band Aid hit. Her debut song "Single" peaked at number three in May, "These Words" topped the charts in August, and she finished off her year with number 6 single "Unwritten" in December. Tom Chaplin and Tim Rice-Oxley had a breakout year with their band Keane. Their iconic song "Somewhere Only We Know" started things off, reaching a high of number-three in February. Three months later, "Everybody's Changing landed one spot lower at number-four in the chart. In August, "Bedshaped" capped off their year entering at number-ten before they both featured on "Do They Know It's Christmas?".

The winner of the first series of Pop Idol, Will Young's "Leave Right Now" carried on its chart run from 2003, having peaked at number-one in December. His first new entry of the year, "Your Game", reached number-three in March. "Friday's Child" took fourth position in the chart in July. Girl group Sugababes had three additional top 10 singles in 2004, including "Too Lost in You" from the end of the previous year. "Caught in a Moment" and "In the Middle" both reached number eight.

Six further acts reached the top 10 with four entries this year. Andre 3000 of the American group OutKast had three hits with his band and one guest spot. "Hey Ya!", first released in 2003, finally peaked at number three in February. "The Way You Move" reached number 7 in April and "Roses" got to number four in July. He also collaborated with Kelis on the number three hit "Millionaire" in October. Kelis herself had two solo hits in 2004, as well as featuring on Enrique Iglesias single "Not In Love", which peaked at number five. "Milkshake" took second spot behind "All This Time" by Michelle McManus in January and "Trick Me" reached the same position in June.

Duncan James from the band Blue reached number two with his debut solo single "I Believe My Heart" (featuring Keedie) and had three top 10 hits with the band: "Breathe Easy", "Bubblin' and "Curtain Falls". McFly's first single, "5 Colours in Her Hair" reached number-one, while follow-ups "Obviously", "That Girl", "Room on the 3rd Floor" all made the top 10.

Morrissey scored four hit singles in 2004: "Irish Blood, English Heart, "First of the Gang to Die", "Let Me Kiss You", "I Have Forgiven Jesus". The Libertines had two hit singles in their own right, "Can't Stand Me Now" and "What Became of the Likely Lads", as well as the Twisted X song "Born in England".

Ronan Keating narrowly missed out on a number-one in 2004, with three singles reaching number two: "She Believes in Me", "I Hope You Dance" and "Father and Son". A fourth single, "Last Thing on My Mind" peaked at number five.

Usher was one of a number of artists with three top-ten entries, including the number one singles "Yeah!" and "Burn". Bono, Justin Hawkins, Lemar, Rachel Stevens and Robbie Williams all featured on the Band Aid single. Christina Aguilera, Britney Spears, Eminem, Girls Aloud, Kanye West, Kylie Minogue and R. Kelly were among the artists who had multiple top 10 entries in 2004.

Chart debuts
Eighty-two artists achieved their first top 10 single in 2004, either as a lead or featured artist. This includes the charity group Band Aid 20 (made up of chart acts but charting together for the first time). Of these, eleven went on to record another hit single that year: 2Play, The 411, Boogie Pimps, Deepest Blue, Dizzee Rascal, Jay Sean, Joss Stone, Maroon 5, Naila Boss, Twista and V. Four artists scored two more top 10 singles in 2004: Franz Ferdinand, Keane, Raghav and The Streets. McFly and Natasha Bedingfield both had three other entries in their breakthrough year.

The following table (collapsed on desktop site) does not include acts who had previously charted as part of a group and secured their first top 10 solo single.  

Notes
Michelle debuted at number-one with "All This Time" in January, but her first chart credit was with her fellow Pop Idol series 2 finalists on "Happy Xmas (War is Over)" at the end of 2003. This also included Sam and Mark, whose single "With a Little Help from My Friends"/"Measure of a Man" marked their debut as a duo.

Twisted X was a supergroup created by the radio station XFM. The song "Born in England" featured several artists who had previously appeared in the UK top 10 (Supergrass and The Libertines) as well as several debutants (James Nesbitt, Bernard Butler and The Delays). Duncan James from Blue debuted with a solo single in 2004, "I Believe My Heart", which was recorded as a duet with Keedie. Another former boyband member - Brian McFadden of Westlife - reached number-one with his first solo single, "Real to Me", while a second song "Irish Son" entered at number 6.

Band Aid 20 was a new iteration of the original Band Aid and Band Aid II supergroups, recording a new version of "Do They Know It's Christmas?" in aid of crisis in Darfur, Sudan. Shaznay Lewis, formerly of All Saints, peaked at number 8 with her debut solo single "Never Felt Like This Before". She also performed on the Band Aid 20 single. Róisín Murphy had appeared in the chart before with Moloko but she featured on "Do They Know It's Christmas?" in her own right. Tom Hannon (of The Divine Comedy), Coldplay's Chris Martin, Tim Wheeler (Ash) and Tim Rice-Oxley and Tom Chaplin (both from the band Keane) had similarly charted with their groups before Band Aid 20.

Songs from films
Original songs from various films entered the top 10 throughout the year. These included "Thunderbirds" (from Thunderbirds), "We Are" (Spider-Man 2), "Car Wash" (Shark Tale) and "Misunderstood" (Bridget Jones: The Edge of Reason).

Charity singles
A number of singles recorded for charity reached the top 10 in the charts in 2004. The Sport Relief single was "Some Girls" by former S Club 7 member Rachel Stevens, peaking at number two on 24 July 2004.

Girls Aloud recorded the Children in Need single for 2004, a cover of The Pretenders song "I'll Stand by You". It was their seventh successive top 10 single and reached number-one on 27 November 2004.

A group of artists came together under the banner of Band Aid 20 and released the single "Do They Know It's Christmas?" in aid of the Darfur region of Sudan. It was the third version of the song to hit the charts after Band Aid and Band Aid II in the 1980s. The song featured artists including Bono, Busted, Daniel Bedingfield, Jamelia and Paul McCartney. It was the Christmas number-one single for 2004, topping the chart for four weeks from 11 December 2004.

Best-selling singles
Band Aid 20 had the best-selling single of the year with "Do They Know It's Christmas?". The song spent six weeks in the top 10 (including four weeks at number one), sold over 1.06 million copies and was certified platinum by the BPI. "F**k It (I Don't Want You Back)" by Eamon came in second place, selling more than 552,000 copies and losing out by around 454,000 sales. DJ Casper's "Cha Cha Slide", "Call on Me" from Eric Prydz and "Yeah!" by Usher featuring Lil Jon and Ludacris made up the top five. Singles by Michelle McManus, Anastacia, Peter Andre featuring Bubbler Ranx, Britney Spears and Frankee (a response song to Eamon called "F.U.R.B. (Fuck You Right Back)") were also in the top ten best-selling singles of the year.

"Do They Know It's Christmas?" (6) was also ranked in the top 10 best-selling singles of the decade.

Top-ten singles

Entries by artist

The following table shows artists who achieved two or more top 10 entries in 2004, including singles that reached their peak in 2003. The figures include both main artists and featured artists, while appearances on ensemble charity records are also counted for each artist. The total number of weeks an artist spent in the top ten in 2004 is also shown.

Notes

 "Hey Ya" re-entered the top 10 on 17 January 2004 (week ending).
 "Mysterious Girl" originally peaked at number two upon its initial release in 1996. In 2004, following a lengthy campaign on The Chris Moyles Show and Andre's appearance on the British reality show I'm a Celebrity, Get Me Out of Here!, the song was re-released and peaked at number-one for one week.
 Released as the official single for Sport Relief.
 "Call on Me" dropped to number 2 on 16 October 2004 (week ending) but returned to the top spot a week later.
  Alicia Keys is only featured (along with Usher) on "My Boo". The song was released as a double-A side single in the United Kingdom with "Confessions Part II".
 Released as the official single for Children in Need.
 Released as a charity single by Band Aid 20 to aid the Darfur region in Sudan.
 Pete Doherty  had one solo hit single, one song with Babyshambles and two with The Libertines.
 Pete Doherty and his band The Libertines were part of the Twisted X supergroup, who charted at number 9 with their single "Born in England" supporting England's UEFA Euro 2004 campaign.
 Figure includes three top 10 hits with the group Outkast.
 Figure includes appearance on Kelis' "Millionaire".
 Figures includes song that first charted in 2003 but peaked in 2004.
 Figure includes an appearance on the "Do They Know It's Christmas?" charity single by Band Aid 20.
 Figure includes three top 10 hits with the group Blue.
 Figure includes appearance on Enrique Iglesias' "Not in Love".
 Figure includes song that peaked in 2003.
 Figure includes three top 10 hits with the group Keane.
 Figure includes two top 10 hits with the group U2.
 Figure includes a top 10 hit with the group Westlife.
 Figure includes two top 10 hits with the group The Darkness.
 Figure includes appearance on Brandy's "Talk About Our Love".
 Figure includes appearances on 2Play's "It Can't Be Right" and "So Confused".
 Figure includes appearances on Cassidy's "Hotel" and Ja Rule's "Wonderful".
 Figure includes a top 10 hit with the group Destiny's Child.
 Figure includes appearances on Mario Winan's "I Don't Wanna Know" and The Pirates' "You Should Really Know".
 Figure includes appearances on 2Play's "It Can't Be Right" and The Pirates' "You Should Really Know".
 Figure includes a top 10 hit with the group N.E.R.D.
 Figure includes appearance on Snoop Dogg's "Drop It Like It's Hot".
 Figure includes two top 10 hits with the group D12.

See also
2004 in British music
List of number-one singles from the 2000s (UK)

References
General

Specific

External links
2004 singles chart archive at the Official Charts Company (click on relevant week)

United Kingdom Top Ten
2004 in British music
2004